Saša Zdjelar (born 20 March 1995) is a Serbian professional footballer who plays for Russian club CSKA Moscow as a midfielder.

Club career
Zdjelar made his senior debut for OFK Beograd in a 3–0 home league win over Novi Pazar on 3 December 2011, aged 16. He was later sold to Greek champions Olympiacos in 2013, but remained at his parent club for the next two years. In total, Zdjelar recorded 67 competitive appearances with the Romantičari.

In the summer of 2015, Zdjelar eventually moved to Greece and joined Olympiacos. He made his debut for the club on 28 October 2015, playing the full 90 minutes in a 2–2 Greek Cup draw versus Platanias. On 13 January 2016, Zdjelar scored his first ever senior goal for Olympiacos in a 6–0 Greek Cup win over Chania.

On 13 January 2017, Zdjelar was loaned to Spanish Segunda División side RCD Mallorca until the end of the season.

On 29 January 2018, he was loaned to Partizan until the end of the 2017-18 season, after being put on Olympiacos' out-of-favour list. At the end of the 2017-18 season, Partizan announced the signing of the player for an estimated fee at the range of €500,000  On 23 May 2018, Zdjelar scored the winner against Mladost Lučani, in the Serbian Cup final.

In 2018-19 season, Zdjelar won his second Serbian Cup trophy and collected 45 appearances for Partizan, across three competitions.

In 2019-20 season, interrupted due to global pandemic of COVID-19, Zdjelar was again the most capped Partizan player, amassing 42 appearances (and skipping only 3 games) across all competitions.

In July 2020, Saša wore Partizan's captain armband for the first time.

On 28 July 2022, Zdjelar signed a contract with Russian Premier League club CSKA Moscow for three years with an option to extend.

International career
Zdjelar represented Serbia at the 2014 UEFA Under-19 Championship, as the team was eliminated in the semi-final by Portugal after penalties. He was also a member of the team that won the gold medal at the 2015 FIFA U-20 World Cup.

On 31 May 2016, Zdjelar made his full international debut for Serbia, coming on as a substitute in a 3–1 friendly win over Israel. He subsequently appeared as an injury-time substitute in a 1–1 friendly draw with Russia at Stade Louis II five days later.

Statistics

Club

International

Honours

Club
Olympiacos
 Superleague Greece: 2015–16
 Greek Cup: Runner-up 2015–16

Partizan
 Serbian Cup: 2017–18, 2018-19

International
Serbia
 FIFA U-20 World Cup: 2015

Notes

References

External links
 
 
 
 

1995 births
Living people
Footballers from Belgrade
Serbian footballers
Association football midfielders
Serbian SuperLiga players
OFK Beograd players
Super League Greece players
Russian Premier League players
Olympiacos F.C. players
RCD Mallorca players
FK Partizan players
PFC CSKA Moscow players
Serbia international footballers
Serbia under-21 international footballers
Serbia youth international footballers
Serbian expatriate footballers
Serbian expatriate sportspeople in Greece
Serbian expatriate sportspeople in Spain
Serbian expatriate sportspeople in Russia
Expatriate footballers in Greece
Expatriate footballers in Spain
Expatriate footballers in Russia